Welcome to the Drama Club is the seventh studio album from rock band Everclear. It was released on September 12, 2006 by Eleven Seven Music. It was the first album to include the new line-up of Everclear, established following the departure of Craig Montoya and Greg Eklund after Everclear's previous album, Slow Motion Daydream.  It was also the first album since Everclear's departure from Capitol Records.

Track listing
All songs written by Art Alexakis.

Personnel
 Art Alexakis: vocals, guitar
 Josh Crawley: keyboards, vocals
 Davey French: guitar, vocals
 Sam Hudson: bass, vocals
 Brett Snyder: drums, percussion, vocals

References

External links

Everclear (band) albums
2006 albums
Eleven Seven Label Group albums
Albums produced by Art Alexakis